USS Mahogany (AN-23/YN-18) was an Aloe-class net laying ship which was assigned to serve the U.S. Navy during World War II with her protective anti-submarine nets.

Built at Cleveland, Ohio
Mahogany (YN 18) was laid down 18 October 1940 by the American Shipbuilding Company, Cleveland, Ohio; launched 13 February 1941; and commissioned 22 December 1942.

World War II service
Shortly after commissioning and sea trials, Mahogany reported to Argentia, Newfoundland. There she conducted net tending, rescue, and icebreaking operations through 1943. On 20 January 1944 she was redesignated AN-23.

Four months later, having received additional armament and equipment, she was assigned to the U.S. Pacific Fleet. She completed passage through the Panama Canal 14 July and continued on to San Diego, California, for further exercises. Arriving Pearl Harbor in August, she soon steamed westward; and, from 14 September into March 1945, she laid and tended torpedo nets, moorings and buoys, and participated in various towing, salvage and demolition operations in the central Pacific Ocean.

By April, Mahogany had moved to the western Pacific Ocean for the invasion of Okinawa. She operated with minecraft during the 82 day campaign, 1 April to 21 July, and then remained in the Okinawa Gunto area until after the end of the war.

Shipwrecked in a typhoon
On 14 September 1945 Mahogany. caught in a typhoon, grounded on a reef in Buckner Bay. She was towed to Guam for repairs, but these promised to be so extensive that she was scrapped. After salvageable equipment had been removed, she decommissioned and her hulk was destroyed 19 April 1946 at Guam.

Honors and awards
Mahogany received one battle star for her participation in the Okinawa Gunto operation.

References 
 
 NavSource Online: Service Ship Photo Archive - YN-18 / AN-23 Mahogany

 

Aloe-class net laying ships
Ships built in Cleveland
1941 ships
World War II net laying ships of the United States